Merritt Bucholz (born 28 June 1966) is an American architect who has set up practice in Ireland with his partner Karen McEvoy. He lectures frequently in various universities in Europe and America.

Early life 

Merritt Bucholz was born in Chicago.

Education 

He attended Cornell University (B.Arch 1993), and Princeton University (M.Arch 1995).

Work 

Emilio Ambasz & Associates, 1990–92;
Paris offices of James Stewart Polshek, Ricardo Bofill and Michel W Kagan, 1992–94;
A&D Wejchert & Partners Architects 1995.

Lecturing 

Head of the School of Design at the University of Limerick, 2021–present;
Inaugural Professor of Architecture at the University of Limerick, 2005–present;
Formerly 
Visiting professor at Harvard University;
Visiting lecturer at Princeton University, Cornell University, University College Dublin, and Dublin Institute of Technology;
External examiner at Waterford Institute of Technology.

Bucholz | McEvoy Architects 
Bucholz | McEvoy Architects were set up by Merritt and his partner Karen in Dublin (1996).

Notable projects
Elm Park Urban Quarter, Dublin.
Leinster House Pavilions, Dublin
SAP Building, Galway
Westmeath County Council Headquarters
City Arts Tower, Dublin
Westmeath County Council Civic Offices
Cork Civic Offices
Cherry Orchard Tower
Environmental Research Institute, UCC
Limerick County Council Headquarters
SAP Building, Dublin
Welcoming Pavilions, Government Buildings, Dublin
Fingal County Hall
Universite Paris VII
Denis Diderot Biology Laboratory, Paris (competition)
Exhibita Research Project
Mueso del Prado Extension (competition)
Smithfield Urban Space
Hartstonge House, Limerick
Lottum Work + Living, Berlin, Germany.

Footnotes

External links
 Official site
 UL Architecture site

1966 births
Living people
20th-century American architects
21st-century American architects
Harvard University staff
Princeton University School of Architecture alumni
Cornell University College of Architecture, Art, and Planning alumni
Academics of the University of Limerick
Princeton University faculty
Cornell University faculty
Academics of University College Dublin
American expatriates in Ireland
Architects from Chicago
People associated with Waterford Institute of Technology